Tepe Sialk is a large ancient archeological site (a tepe, "hill, tell") in a suburb of the city of Kashan, Isfahan Province, in central Iran, close to Fin Garden. The culture that inhabited this area has been linked to the Zayandeh River Culture.

History

A joint study between Iran's Cultural Heritage Organization, the Louvre, and the Institut Francais de Recherche en Iran also verifies the oldest settlements in Sialk to date to around 6000–5500 BC. The Sialk ziggurat was built around 3000 BC.

Sialk, and the entire area around it, is thought to have originated as a result of the pristine large water sources nearby that still run today. The Cheshmeh ye Soleiman ("Solomon's Spring") has been bringing water to this area from nearby mountains for thousands of years. The Fin garden, built in its present form in the 17th century, is a popular tourist attraction. It is here that the kings of the Safavid dynasty would spend their vacations away from their capital cities. It is also here that Abu Lu'lu'a Firuz, the Persian assassin of the second caliph Umar ibn al-Khattab, is popularly believed to have been buried. All these remains are located in the same location where Sialk is.

Archaeology

Tepe Sialk was excavated for three seasons (1933, 1934, and 1937) by a team headed by Roman Ghirshman and his wife Tania Ghirshman.
Studies related to the site were conducted by D.E. McCown, Y. Majidzadeh, and P. Amieh. 
Excavation was resumed for several seasons between 1999 
and 2004 by a team from the University of Pennsylvania and Iran's Cultural Heritage Organization led by Sadegh Malek Shahmirzadi called the Sialk Reconsideration Project. 

In 2008 and 2009 an Iranian team led by Hassan Fazeli Nashli and supported by Robin Coningham of the University of Durham have worked at the northern mound finding 6 Late Neolithic burials.

Artifacts from the original dig ended up mostly at the Louvre, while some can be found at the British Museum, the Metropolitan Museum of Art in New York, and the National Museum of Iran and in the hands of private collectors. These artifacts consisted of some very fine painted potteries.

Northern mound

The northern mound (tell) is the oldest; the occupation dates back to the end of the seventh millennium BC. The mound is composed of two levels: Sialk I (the oldest), and Sialk II. Sialk I-level architecture is relatively rudimentary. Tombs containing pottery have been uncovered. The ceramic is initially rather rough, then becomes of better quality with the time.

Zagheh archaic painted ware (c. 6000–5500 BC) is found in Tepe Sialk I, sub-levels 1–2. This is the early painted ware, that was first excavated at Tepe Zagheh in the Qazvin plain. In sub-periods 3, 4 and 5, the pottery has a clear surface with painted decoration. Stone or bone tools were still used.

The Sialk II level sees the first appearance of metallurgy. The archaeological material found in the buildings of this period testifies to increasing links with the outside world.

Southern mound
The southern mound (tell) includes the Sialk III and IV levels. The first, divided into seven sub-periods, corresponds to the fifth millennium and the beginning of the fourth (c. 4000 BC). This period is in continuity with the previous one, and sees the complexity of architecture (molded bricks, use of stone) and crafts, especially metallurgical.

Silver metallurgy
Evidence demonstrates that Tepe Sialk was an important metal production center in central Iran during the Sialk III and Sialk IV periods. A significant amount of metallurgical remains were found during the excavations in the 1990s and later. This includes large amounts of slag pieces, litharge cakes, and crucibles and moulds.

At Tappeh Sialk, the oldest evidence of silver production in the world has been found - such as the litharge fragments and cakes.

"Pieces of charcoal found in one of the furnaces in which litharge fragments were found provided a radiocarbon date of 3660-3520 B.C. which introduces them as the oldest so far known fragments of such process in the ancient world."

Some other ancient sites in Iran from the same time have also revealed silver production, such as Arisman, and Tappeh Hissar. These sites are attributed to Sialk III-IV and Hissar II-III periods.

Cultural development
Sialk IV level begins in the second half of the fourth millennium. For the oldest sub-periods of the Sialk IV, there are links with the Mesopotamian civilizations of Uruk and Jemdet Nasr.

Later on, the material is similar to that of Susa III (Proto-Elamite level), so this is where the Proto-Elamite horizon at Sialk is located, as is also evidenced by the discovery here of some Proto-Elamite clay tablets.

The ruins of what would be the oldest Ziggurat in the world are found at this same Sialk IV level.

This period ends with the temporary abandonment of the site at the beginning of the third millennium.

Second millennium BC

After an abandonment of more than a millennium, the Sialk site is reoccupied in the second half of the second millennium. This last phase of occupation of the site is divided into two periods: Sialk V and Sialk VI. The archaeological material of these two levels has been mostly found in the two necropolises, called necropolis A and necropolis B.

The first represents the Sialk V level. Here are found weapons and other objects in bronze, as well as jewelry, and some iron items. The ceramic is gray-black, or red, sometimes with some decorations that consist of geometric patterns, and can be compared to items coming from the sites in Gorgan valley (the later levels of Tureng Tepe, and Tepe Hissar).

Images

See also 

 Ancient Iranian history
 Cities of the Ancient Near East
 Elamite Empire
 Iranian Architecture
 Kashan
 Gerdkooh ancient hill
 List of Iranian castles

Notes

References
Rémy Boucharlat, "(Les) Recherches Archéologiques Françaises en Iran / Pažūheš-hā-ye bāstān-šenāsī Farānse dar Īrān", Téhéran 1380/2001. Téhéran, Éditions Musée National d’Iran, 20 octobre au 21 novembre 2001
Yousef Majidzadeh, Sialk III and the Pottery Sequence at Tepe Ghabristan: The Coherence of the Cultures of the Central Iranian Plateau, Iran, vol. 19, 1981
Ṣādiq Malik Šahmīrzādī, Sialk: The Oldest Fortified Village of Iran: Final Report, Iranian Center for Archaeological Research, 2006, 
SOŁTYSIAK (Arkadiusz), FAZELI NASHLI (Has-san), "Evidence of late Neolithic cremation at Tepe Sialk", Iran. Iranica antiqua, 51, p. 1-19, 2016

External links

Iranian.com
Payvand.com News item on Sialk
Kashan Municipality

Tells (archaeology)
Populated places established in the 6th millennium BC
Populated places disestablished in the 2nd millennium BC
Buildings and structures completed in the 30th century BC
Archaeological sites in Iran
Architecture in Iran
Castles in Iran
Ancient cities of the Middle East
Ancient Near East temples
Former populated places in Iran
Buildings and structures in Kashan
Pyramids in Iran
Ziggurats
National works of Iran
Jemdet Nasr period